Secondigliano is an under-construction metro station that will serve Line 1 on the Naples Metro.
Secondigliano station, designed by Antonio Nanu, along with the Miano and Regina Margherita stations, will serve the Secondigliano and Miano areas.

See also
Railway stations in Italy
List of Naples metro stations

Proposed Naples Metro stations
Railway stations in Italy opened in the 21st century